Yinglong is a winged dragon and rain deity in ancient Chinese mythology.

Name
This legendary creature's name combines yìng  "respond; correspond; answer; reply; agree; comply; consent; promise; adapt; apply" and lóng  "Chinese dragon". Although the former character is also pronounced (with a different tone) yīng  "should; ought to; need to; proper; suitable", yinglong  definitively means "responsive dragon; responding dragon" and not "proper dragon".

Classical usages
The Chinese classics frequently mention yinglong  "a winged rain-dragon" in myths about the Three Sovereigns and Five Emperors, especially the Yellow Emperor and his alleged descendant King Yu. The examples below, limited to books with English translations, are roughly arranged in chronological order, although some heterogeneous texts have uncertain dates of composition.

Chuci

The (3rd–2nd centuries BCE) Chu Ci "Songs of Chu" mentions Yinglong helping King Yu , the legendary founder of the Xia dynasty, to control the mythic Great Deluge. According to Chinese mythology, Emperor Yao  assigned Yu's father Gun , who was supposedly a descendant of the Yellow Emperor, to control massive flooding, but he failed. Yao's successor, Emperor Shun , had Gun executed and his body exposed, but when Gun's corpse did not decompose, it was cut open and Yu was born by parthenogenesis. Shun appointed Yu to control the floods, and after succeeding through diligently constructing canals, Yu divided ancient China into the Nine Provinces.

The Heavenly Questions section (3) asks about Yinglong, in context with Zhulong  "Torch Dragon". Tianwen, which Hawkes 1985:38, 126) characterizes as "a shamanistic catechism consisting of questions about cosmological, astronomical, mythological and historical matters", and "is written in an archaic language to be found nowhere else in the Chu anthology" excepting "one or two short passages" in the Li Sao section.

The (early second century CE) Chuci commentary of Wang Yi  answers that Yinglong drew lines on the ground to show Yu where to dig drainage and irrigation canals.

Classic of Mountains and Seas
The (c. 4th century BCE – 1st century CE) Classic of Mountains and Seas  records variant Yinglong myths in two chapters of "The Classic of the Great Wilderness" section. The "Responding Dragon" is connected with two deities who rebelled against the Yellow Emperor: the war-god and rain-god Chiyou  "Jest Much" and the giant Kua Fu  "Boast Father".

"The Classic of the Great Wilderness: The East" (14) mentions Yinglong killing both Chiyou "Jest Much" and Kua Fu "Boast Father", and describes using Yinglong images in sympathetic magic for rainmaking. 

Guo Pu's (early 4th century CE) commentary (tr. Visser 1913:114) mentions tulong  "earth/clay dragon", "The earthen dragons of the present day find their origin in this."

"The Classic of the Great Wilderness: The North" (17) mentions Yinglong in two myths about killing Kua Fu "Boast Father". The first version says Yinglong killed him in punishment for drinking rivers and creating droughts while chasing the sun.

The second mythic version says the Yellow Emperor's daughter Ba  "Droughtghoul" killed Chiyou "Jest Much" after Yinglong failed. Ba is a drought-demon analogous with Kua Fu.

Based on textual history of Yinglong, Chiyou, Kua Fu, and related legends, Bernhard Karlgren (1946:284-5) concludes that "all these nature myths are purely Han-time lore, and there is no trace of them in pre-Han sources", with two exceptions. Ba, who is "a very old folk-lore figure", already occurs in the c. Spring and Autumn period Classic of Poetry (258), and Yinglong, "who directed the flow of rivers and seas", occurs in the c. Warring States period Tianwen (above).

Huainanzi
The (2nd century BCE) Huainanzi uses Yinglong  in three chapters. Ying also occurs in ganying  (lit. "sensation and response") "resonance; reaction; interaction; influence; induction", which Charles Le Blanc (1985:8-9) posits as the Huannanzi text's central and pivotal idea.

"Forms of Earth" (4) explains how animal evolution originated through dragons, with Yinglong as the progenitor of quadrupeds. Carr (1990:107) notes this Responsive Dragon is usually pictured with four wings, perhaps paralleling four legs.
All creatures, winged, hairy, scaly and mailed, find their origin in the dragon. The yu-kia produced the flying dragon, the flying dragon gave birth to the phoenixes, and after them the luan-niao and all birds, in general the winged beings, were born successively. The mao-tuh ("hairy calf") produced the ying-lung, the ying-lung gave birth to the kien-ma, and afterwards the k'i-lin and all quadrupeds, in general the hairy beings, were born successively. … (tr. Visser 1913:65) 
Wolfram Eberhard (1968:351) suggests this "otherwise unknown" maodu "hairy calf" alludes to the "water buffalo".

"Peering into the Obscure" (6) describes Fuxi and Nüwa being transported by yinglong  and qingqiu  "green qiu-dragons", while accompanied by baichi  "white chi-dragons" and benshe  "speeding snakes". 
They rode the thunder chariot, using winged dragons as the inner pair and green dragons as the outer pair. They clasped the magic jade tablets and displayed their charts. Yellow clouds hung inter-woven (to form a coverlet over the chariot) and they (the whole retinue) were preceded by white serpents and followed by speeding snakes. (tr. Le Blanc 1985:161-2)
Gao Yu's (2nd century CE) Huainanzi commentary glosses yinglong  as a "winged dragon" and qiu  as a "hornless dragon".

"The Art of Rulership" (9) parallels the yinglong with the tengshe  "soaring snake" dragon. "The t'eng snake springs up into the mist; the flying ying dragon ascends into the sky mounting the clouds; a monkey is nimble in the trees and a fish is agile in the water." Ames (1981:74) compares the Hanfeizi attribution of this yinglong and tengshe metaphor to the Legalist philosopher Shen Dao.
Shen Tzu said: "The flying dragon mounts the clouds and the t'eng snake wanders in the mists. But when the clouds dissipate and the mists clear, the dragon and the snake become the same as the earthworm and the large-winged black ant because they have lost that on which they ride. (tr. Ames 1981:176)

Other texts
Yinglong occurs in various additional Chinese texts. For instance, the Records of the Grand Historian, Book of Han, and Book of the Later Han histories.

The early third century CE Guangya dictionary (tr. Visser 1913:73) defines yinglong "winged dragon" as one of the principal dragons. "If a dragon has scales, he is called jiaolong []; if wings, yinglong; if a horn, qiulung; and if he has no horn, he is called qilong".

The early sixth century CE Shuyiji  "Records of Strange Things" (tr. Visser 1913:72) lists yinglong as a 1000-year-old dragon. "A water snake ( shui hui) after five hundred years changes into a jiao, a jiao after a thousand years changes into a long, a long after five hundred years changes into a jiulong ("horned dragon") and after a thousand years into a yinglong".

Comparative mythology

The yinglong mythically relates with other Chinese flying dragons and rain deities such as the tianlong ("heavenly dragon"), feilong ("flying dragon"), hong ("rainbow dragon"), and jiao ("flood dragon").

Flying dragons
Visser (1913:83) mentions that texts like the Daoist Liexian Zhuan often record "flying dragons or ying-lung drawing the cars of gods or holy men". Besides the Huainanzi (above) mentioning a pair of yinglong pulling the chariot of Fuxi and Nüwa, analogous examples (Visser 1913:122-4) include legends of Huangdi ascending to heaven on a dragon (Shiji) and Yu riding a carriage drawn by two flying dragons (Bowuzhi). Carr (1990:106) compares pairs of Yinglong with motifs on Chinese bronzes showing two symmetrical dragons intertwined like Fuxi and Nüwa.

Porter (1996:44-45) interprets the tail of the terrestrial Yinglong, which "uses its tail to sketch on the land a map of channel-like formations whereby the floodwaters were allowed to drain", as the tail of the celestial dragon Scorpius, which is "situated precisely where the Milky Way splits into two branches". The (4th century CE) Shiyiji  (tr. Porter) retells the Yu flood-control myth in terms of the Four Symbols, namely, the Yellow Dragon or Azure Dragon and the Black Tortoise. "Yü exhausted his energy creating channels, diverting the waters and establishing mountains as the yellow dragon dragged its tail in front and the black turtle carried green-black mud (used to build the channels) in back."

Rain dragons
"All traditions about Ying-lung are vague", writes Eberhard (1968:350-351). Although the legendary Yinglong dragon helped Yu to control floods, "Yü was frequently bothered by dragons", most notably the flood-deity Gonggong's minister Xiangliu . Eberhard, based on Sun Jiayi's identification of Xiangliu as an eel, concludes that Yinglong was an eel as well:

Eberhard concludes that Yinglong and the mythic elements about Yu "testify to the connection between Yü and the cultures of the south, which differ from Yü myths of the Ba culture". Carr (1990:106) cites Chen Mengjia's hypothesis, based on studies of Shang dynasty oracle bones, that Yinglong was originally associated with the niqiu  "loach".

Yinglong representations were anciently used in rain-magic ceremonies, where Eberhard (1968:247-248) says, "the most important animal is always a dragon made of clay". Besides controlling rain and drought, the Yinglong Responsive Dragon did something else: "With his tail he drew lines in the earth and thus created the rivers … In other words, the dragon made the waterways – the most important thing for all cultivators of rice.

References
Birrell, Anne, tr. 2000. The Classic of Mountains and Seas. Penguin.
Carr, Michael. 1990. "Chinese Dragon Names", Linguistics of the Tibeto-Burman Area 13.2:87-189.
Eberhard, Wolfram. 1968. The Local Cultures of South and East China. E. J. Brill.
Groot, J.J.M. de. 1910. The Religious System of China 6. E. J. Brill.
Hawkes, David, tr. 1985. The Songs of the South: An Anthology of Ancient Chinese Poems by Qu Yuan and Other Poets. Penguin.
Karlgren, Bernhard. 1946. "Legends and Cults in Ancient China," Bulletin of the Museum of Far Eastern Antiquities 18:199-365.
Major, John S. 1993. Heaven and Earth in Early Han Thought: Chapters Three, Four, and Five of the Huainanzi. SUNY Press.
Porter, Deborah Lynn. 1996. From Deluge to Discourse: Myth, History, and the Generation of Chinese Fiction. SUNY.
Schiffeler, John W. 1978. The Legendary Creatures of the Shan hai ching. Hwa Kang.
Visser, Marinus Willern de. 1913. The Dragon in China and Japan. J. Müller.

External links
 More about Yinglong

Chinese dragons
Four benevolent animals
Rain deities